The 2001 Canberra International was a women's tennis tournament played on outdoor hard courts at the National Sports Club in Canberra, Australia and was part of the Tier III category of the 2001 WTA Tour. It was the inaugural edition of the tournament and was held from 7 through 13 January 2001. Unseeded Justine Henin won the singles title and earned $27,000 first-prize money.

Finals

Singles

 Justine Henin defeated  Sandrine Testud 6–2, 6–2
 It was Henin's 2nd title of the year and the 3rd of her career.

Doubles

 Nicole Arendt /  Ai Sugiyama defeated  Nannie de Villiers /  Annabel Ellwood 6–4, 7–6(7–2)
 It was Arendt's 1st title of the year and the 14th of her career. It was Sugiyama's 1st title of the year and the 21st of her career.

WTA entrants

Seeds

 Rankings are as of January 1, 2001.

Other entrants
The following players received wildcards into the singles main draw:
  Annabel Ellwood
  Amanda Grahame

The following players received entry from the qualifying draw:
  Wynne Prakusya
  Selima Sfar
  Yuka Yoshida
  Lenka Němečková

External links
 ITF tournament edition details
 Tournament draws

 
Canberra International
Canberra International
Canberra International